|}

References

Sariaya
Buildings and structures in Quezon